In ecology, a feeding frenzy occurs when predators are overwhelmed by the amount of prey available. The term is also used as an idiom in the English language.

Examples in nature
For example, a large school of fish can cause nearby sharks, such as the lemon shark, to enter into a feeding frenzy. This can cause the sharks to go wild, biting anything that moves, including each other or anything else within biting range. Another functional explanation for feeding frenzy is competition amongst predators. This term is most often used when referring to sharks or piranhas.

English language uses
It has also been used as a term within journalism.

The term is occasionally used to describe a plethora of something. For instance, a 2016 Bloomberg News article is entitled: "March Madness Is a Fantasy Sports Feeding Frenzy."
In economics the term can be used to describe the economics of the music industry, as large music companies acquired smaller music companies.

See also
 Bait ball
 Adage
 Comprehension of idioms
 Idiom in English language
 Media feeding frenzy
 Phrasal verb
 Metaphor

References

Eating behaviors
Idioms
Adages

fr:Attaque de requin#La frénésie alimentaire